30: The Greatest Hits (also known as Diesel 30) is a greatest hits album by Australian rock musician, Diesel (a.k.a. Johnny Diesel, Mark Lizotte) who previously fronted Johnny Diesel & the Injectors. 

The album was released on 3 August 2018 via Bloodlines, Universal Music Australia and features 14 Top 40 hits.

The album was supported by a "Give Me Saturday Night" tour with Diesel saying "I can't wait to light up Saturday nights right across Australia on this very special 30th Anniversary Tour".

Reception
Jeff Jenkins from Stack Magazine said "The album tells the tale of an artist who rose above the marketing and the hype to create a compelling catalogue."

Track listing

Give Me Saturday Night Tour

Charts

Release history

References 

Diesel (musician) albums
2018 greatest hits albums
Universal Music Australia albums
Compilation albums by Australian artists